John William Bourchier, CBE (12 October 1929 – 31 August 2017) was an Australian politician. Born in Ballarat, he was a company manager before entering politics. In 1972, he was elected to the Australian House of Representatives as the Liberal member for Bendigo, unseating Labor incumbent David Kennedy even as Labor ended the Coalition's record 23 years in government. He served as a party whip in the Fraser Government. In 1978 he led a delegation of MPs to Russia. He held the seat until his defeat by the future Victorian Premier John Brumby in 1983.

Bourchier was married to Doreen and had four children. He died in Brisbane on 31 August 2017.

References

1929 births
2017 deaths
Liberal Party of Australia members of the Parliament of Australia
Members of the Australian House of Representatives for Bendigo
Members of the Australian House of Representatives
Australian Commanders of the Order of the British Empire
20th-century Australian politicians